In physics, a plasmaron is a quasiparticle arising in a system that has strong plasmon-electron interactions. It is a quasiparticle formed by quasiparticle-quasiparticle interactions, since both plasmons and electron holes are collective modes of different kinds. It has recently been observed in graphene and earlier in elemental bismuth.

References

Quasiparticles
Plasmonics